FK1012 is a dimer consisting of two molecules of FK506 (tacrolimus) linked via their vinyl groups. It is used as a research tool in chemically induced dimerization applications. FK506 binding proteins (FKBPs) do not normally form dimers but can be caused to dimerize in the presence of FK1012. Genetically engineered proteins based on FKBPs can be used to manipulate protein localization, signalling pathways and protein activation.

References

Further reading
 

Macrolides
Dimers (chemistry)